In enzymology, a glucosamine N-acetyltransferase is an enzyme that catalyzes the chemical reaction

acetyl-CoA + D-glucosamine  CoA + N-acetyl-D-glucosamine

Thus, the two substrates of this enzyme are acetyl-CoA and D-glucosamine, whereas its two products are CoA and N-acetyl-D-glucosamine.

This enzyme belongs to the family of transferases, specifically those acyltransferases transferring groups other than aminoacyl groups.  The systematic name of this enzyme class is acetyl-CoA:D-glucosamine N-acetyltransferase. Other names in common use include glucosamine acetylase, and glucosamine acetyltransferase.  This enzyme participates in aminosugars metabolism.

References

 

EC 2.3.1
Enzymes of unknown structure